Jacques Rémy (21 June 1911 – 1 December 1981) was the pen name of Rémy Assayas or Raymond Assayas a Turkish-born Jewish French screenwriter.

Rémy is the father of film director and critic Olivier Assayas and writer Michka Assayas.

Selected filmography
 The Damned (1947)
 The Secret of Mayerling (1949)
 The Fighting Men (1950)
 The Big Meeting (1950)
 Paris Vice Squad (1951)
 Passion (1951)
 Paris Is Always Paris (1951)
 Matrimonial Agency (1952)
 The House on the Dune (1952)
 Cavallina storna (1953)
 Passionate Song (1953)
 Follow That Man (1953)
 Beatrice Cenci (1956)
 Engaged to Death (1957)
 The Night Heaven Fell (1958)
 The Cat (1958)
 The Cat Shows Her Claws (1960)
 All the Gold in the World (1961)
 Casablanca, Nest of Spies (1963)
 The Dirty Game (1965)

References

Bibliography
 Dayna Oscherwitz & MaryEllen Higgins. The A to Z of French Cinema. Scarecrow Press, 2009.

External links

1911 births
1981 deaths
20th-century French screenwriters
Turkish Sephardi Jews
Turkish emigrants to France
Israeli Sephardi Jews
Israeli Mizrahi Jews